Bethel African Methodist Episcopal Church is a historic African Methodist Episcopal (A.M.E.) church located at 805 Monroe Street in Vicksburg, Mississippi. The church's congregation was established in 1864, making it the first A.M.E. church in the state. Its first church was a preexisting church building built in 1828; this was demolished to make way for the present building, which was completed in 1912. The church has a Romanesque Revival design with an auditorium plan, a common style for church buildings built in Mississippi at the time. The building features a four-story tower on the north side topped by a crenellated pyramid roof, stained glass rose windows on three sides, and a cross gabled roof with a corbelled parapet.

The church was added to the National Register of Historic Places on July 30, 1992.

References

Methodist churches in Mississippi
Churches on the National Register of Historic Places in Mississippi
Romanesque Revival church buildings in Mississippi
Churches completed in 1912
Buildings and structures in Vicksburg, Mississippi
African Methodist Episcopal churches
1912 establishments in Mississippi
National Register of Historic Places in Warren County, Mississippi
20th-century Methodist church buildings in the United States